The list of those invited to join the Academy of Motion Picture Arts and Sciences as members in 2004.

Actors
Shohreh Aghdashloo
Paul Bettany
Keisha Castle-Hughes
Patricia Clarkson
Keith David
Hope Davis
Maggie Gyllenhaal
Scarlett Johansson
Viggo Mortensen
Bill Nighy
Sean Penn
Audrey Tautou
Ken Watanabe

Animators
Bill Berg
Brad Bird
Aaron Blaise
Sylvain Chomet
Adam Elliot
Tony Fucile
Roger Gould
Bud Luckey
Dominique Monféry
Steve Oedekerk
Carlos Saldanha
Shane Zalvin

Scientific and technical
Loren C. Carpenter

Set decorators
Robert Gould
Denise Pizzini
Leslie Pope

Casting directors
Suzanne Smith
Ilene Starger

Cinematographers
James Carter
Jeff Cronenweth
Ron Garcia
Anastas Michos
Kees Van Oostrum
Amelia Vincent
Dariusz Wolski

Costume designers
Aude Bronson Howard
John David Ridge
David Carl Robinson
Penny Rose
Jacqueline West

Directors
Miguel Arteta
Gurinder Chadha
Peter Chelsom
Sofia Coppola (as a member of Writer)
Michael Corrente
Ashutosh Gowariker
Shawn Adam Levy
Gillies MacKinnon
Fernando Meirelles
Bruce Robinson

Documentary filmmakers
Joe Berlinger
Lourdes Portillo
Bruce Sinofsky

Executives
Chris Albrecht
Peter Block
Rory Bruer
Jeffrey M. Freedman
Stephen A. Gilula
Jere R. Hausfater
James Horowitz
Graham King
Jay Rakow
Jeff Robinov
Sara Rose
Michael Rudnitsky
Courtenay L. Valenti
Charles T. Viane
Clark Woods

Film editors
Nick Moore
Daniel Rezende
Jamie Selkirk
Lee Smith
Craig Wood

Live action short filmmakers
Florian Baxmeyer

Makeup and hairstylists
Jean A. Black
Sue Cabral-Ebert
Bill Corso
Peter King
Mary Hart Mastro
Peter Montagna

Musicians
Bill Abbott
Nick Glennie-Smith
Charles Martin Inouye
Annette Kudrak
John Ottman

Producers
Duncan S. Henderson
William Horberg
Loretha Jones
Nancy Juvonen
Stephen McEveety
Don Murphy
Gil Netter
Deborah Schindler
Jane Startz

Production designers
Ian Gracie
Owen Paterson
Anne Pritchard
Barry Robison
William Sandell

Public relations personnel 
Hilary Judge Clark
Adam Fogelson
Juli Goodwin
Laura C. Kim
Timothy Nett
Paula Silver

Sound designers
James F. Austin
Michael Grant Hedges
Avi Laniado
David Lee
Tony Pilkington
Daniel Sperry
Ethan Van der Ryn

Visual effects artists
John “DJ” DesJardin
Scott Frankel
Mark Freund
Geoff Heron
Robert Stromberg

Writers
Shari Springer Berman
L. M. Kit Carson
Sofia Coppola (as a member of Director)
D. V. DeVincentis
Steven Knight
Bráulio Mantovani
Robert Pulcini

See also 

 List of invitees for AMPAS Membership (2007)

References

2004
Lists of people by honor or award
Invitees,2004